West High School is a public high school located in Bakersfield, California, United States. The school serves about 2,500 students in grades 9 to 12 in the Kern High School District.  Total student enrollment is 2,525.

Notable alumni 

 Nikki Blue, former UCLA and WNBA basketball player
 A.J. Jefferson, now known as Anthony Orange, football player; undrafted rookie cornerback for the Minnesota Vikings
 Brock Marion, football players, NFL defensive back, 1993-2004
 Ryan Mathews, football player; first-round selection and 12th overall pick in the 2010 NFL Draft; San Diego Chargers, NFL running back

References 

Educational institutions established in 1965
High schools in Bakersfield, California
Public high schools in California
1965 establishments in California